Luigi Diligenza (10 February 1921 – 25 May 2011) was an Italian prelate of the Roman Catholic Church.

Biography
Diligenza was born in Arzano, Italy, and ordained a priest on 8 August 1943. He was appointed bishop of the Archdiocese of Capua on 1 March 1978 and ordained bishop on 23 April 1978. He retired from the diocese on 29 April 1997.

See also
Archdiocese of Capua

References

External links
Catholic-Hierarchy
Capua diocese website (Italian)

20th-century Italian Roman Catholic bishops
Archbishops of Capua
1921 births
2011 deaths